House of Assembly elections were held in Tobago on 25 January 2021 where 12 members were elected in the eleventh election since the Assembly was established in 1980. This election marked the first time in history that both parties elected, the People's National Movement (PNM) and Progressive Democratic Patriots (PDP) won an equal number seats of 6-6, despite the PNM winning the popular vote, resulting in a deadlock and a constitutional crisis with both political parties and Prime Minister Keith Rowley seeking senior counsel advice on the way forward. This election was the first time after 20 years in power that the PNM lost its absolute majority. This election also marked the first time a female political leader was elected to the Assembly and the first time a woman led a major political party or a political party with representation in the Assembly, following the 2020 Tobago Council of the People's National Movement leadership election where Health Secretary, councillor and former Trinidad and Tobago Ambassador to Costa Rica and former Deputy Chief Secretary of Tobago Tracy Davidson-Celestine made history by being elected as the PNM's first female political leader at the regional or national level and one of the first bilingual political leaders in the country's history. If Davidson-Celestine and the PNM were to be elected with a majority to their sixth consecutive term in office, she would have made history, becoming the first female Chief Secretary of Tobago. The election was held alongside local by-elections in Trinidad in which the PNM and UNC retained two districts and the PNM losing one to the UNC.

To break the deadlock and offer a solution to the constitutional crisis, Parliament intervened and passed the THA Amendment Act in March 2021 allowing the Election and Boundaries Commission (EBC) the mandate to increase the electoral boundaries. In September 2021, the EBC report was passed in the Parliament, increasing the electoral boundaries from 12 seats to 15. On 6 October 2021, Chief Secretary Ancil Dennis announced the December 2021 Tobago House of Assembly election to be held on 6 December 2021.

Background

2017 Tobago House of Assembly election 
The governing Tobago Council of the People's National Movement led by Kelvin Charles were able to retain a strong majority in the Assembly, though not as impressive as their total sweep of all 12 seats in the previous election. Charles became Chief Secretary following the retirement of his predecessor Orville London.

Leadership change 
In 2020 Kelvin Charles lost re-election as Leader of the Tobago Council of the People's National Movement and was replaced by Tracy Davidson-Celestine. Days before a vote of no-confidence in Chief Secretary Kelvin Charles petitioned by eight of the 12 members of the THA to Presiding Officer Vanessa Cutting-Thomas, Charles resigned as Chief Secretary and was replaced by elected assembly member Ancil Dennis with Davidson-Celestine, who is not an elected member of the assembly, being appointed as a councilor in the THA and Health Secretary.

2020 Trinidad and Tobago General Election 
At the 2020 general election, there was no net change in the number of seats for each party, the PNM decreased their vote share to 61% but was able to retain both seats. The PDP managed 39% of the vote.

Lead candidates 
On 24 November 2019, incumbent Minority Leader in the Tobago House of Assembly and Progressive Democratic Patriots (PDP) political leader and Public Services Association President Watson Duke publicly endorsed incumbent assembly member for Parlatuvier/ L’Anse Fourmi/Speyside and PDP deputy political leader, Farley Chavez Augustine, as the party's lead candidate for the election. Following the 2020 Tobago Council of the People's National Movement leadership election held on January 19, 2020, Tracy Davidson-Celestine was elected as the party's first female political leader and thus the lead candidate for the PNM.

Electoral system 
All twelve members are elected via first-past-the-post.

Voters
All Tobagonians and Commonwealth citizens aged 18 or over, legally resident in Tobago and who have resided in an electoral district for at least two months prior to the election date are entitled to vote in the elections.

Parties
Political parties registered with the Elections And Boundaries Commission can contest the House of Assembly election as a party. The following registered parties contested the House of Assembly election:

Campaign 
Both the PNM and PDP announced candidates in all 12 districts. Former Presiding Officer of the Tobago House of Assembly and defeated candidate in the 2020 Tobago Council of the PNM leadership election, Denise Tsoiafatt Angus, who endorsed Davidson Celestine in the second round of the 2020 Tobago Council of the People's National Movement leadership election, filed to run in as an independent candidate in the electoral district of Scarborough/ Calder Hall on January 4, after not being chosen to represent the party for the seat of Scarborough/ Calder Hall, despite being the choice of three out of five PNM party groups. Other candidates include defeated 2020 general election candidates for the constituency of Tobago West, UTP political leader Ricardo Phillip, CARM political leader Nickocy Phillips and journalist Anthony Hector.

Autonomy, corruption, specifically with respect to an incomplete Main Ridge Forest zip line project and the leadership role of controversial PDP political leader and Public Services Association President Watson Duke and his treatment towards women were persistently covered in the media in the lead up to the election. PDP deputy political leader Farley Chavez Augustine said that a 2016 Auditor General management letter on the Main Ridge Forest zipline project revealed that only rope was discovered when the department searched for the $2.5 million material and equipment spent by the Assembly, on the zipline while Davidson Celestine was Tourism and Transport Secretary. The PNM-led Assembly and Prime Minister Rowley has denied any truth to the corruption allegations, stating that although the PNM is not perfect, the party is not corrupt. The PNM has made allegations that the PDP intends to separate Tobago from Trinidad and has been accused of bringing racism into the campaign by alleging that the PDP is a proxy for the United National Congress (UNC), linking both the UNC and PDP to Trumpism and comparing PDP political leader Watson Duke former United States president Donald Trump.

Marginal seats
The following lists identify and rank seats by the margin by which the party's candidate finished behind the winning candidate in the 2017 election.

For information purposes only, seats that have changed hands through subsequent byelections have been noted. Seats whose members have changed party allegiance are ignored.

  = appears in two lists

Assembly members not standing for re-election

Candidates by district 

Names in boldface type represent party leaders.
 † represents that the incumbent did not run again.
 ‡ = Ran for re-election in different district
 § represents that the incumbent was defeated for nomination.
 ₰ represents that the incumbent ran in another district and lost the nomination
 ‡ represents that the incumbent ran in a different district.

Campaign slogans, songs and manifestos

Opinion polls

Graphical summary

The North American Caribbean Teachers Association (NACTA) commissioned an opinion poll for the election sampling the electorate's opinion.

Seat projection

Individual poll

Approval ratings 
The tables below list the public approval ratings of the leaders and leading candidates of the main political parties in Tobago.

Tracy Davidson-Celestine

Farley Chavez Augustine

Watson Duke

Results

By electoral district

Consequences 
Trinidad and Tobago's parliament voted on 20 February in favour of a law increasing the number of seats in the Tobago's regional assembly to an uneven 15, which is expected to be followed by early election once new constituencies are drawn, in order to avoid potential seat ties in the future. On September 15, the Trinidad and Tobago House of Representatives passed the EBC (Local Government and Tobago House of Assembly) (Tobago) Order by a margin of 21-18, after which it was passed in the Senate before being signed into law by the President. The bill added three new seats: Lambeau/Lowlands, Darryl Spring/Whim, and Mt St George/Goodwood. All but two of the original districts were also modified slightly under the bill. The December 2021 Tobago House of Assembly election were thus called for 6 December 2021.

See also
2020 Tobago Council of the People's National Movement election
2020 Trinidad and Tobago general election
2019 Trinidadian local elections

Notes

References

External links
Elections And Boundaries Commission | Partners in Democracy
Tobago House of Assembly

References

2021 in Trinidad and Tobago
Local elections in Trinidad and Tobago
Tobago